is a Japanese manga series written and illustrated by Fujihiko Hosono. It was originally serialized in Shogakukan's Weekly Shōnen Sunday from 1982 to 1985, and was collected into 12 bound volumes. It was adapted into a fifty-episode anime television series which aired from 1984 to 1985.

Plot
Once upon a time in the city of Tokyo, there was a nine-year-old third-grade boy who went by the name of Hanpeita Tsukuda. He studies in Oedo Elementary School with the American Linda Skylark, the boss Toshimitsu Saigo and the nerdy Kashio Fujita. They often pick on him for nothing but this. And therefore, it began one day when Hanpeita bought himself a pet bird before Ganmo arrived to Earth.

One morning Hanpeita's strong older sister Tsukune Tsukuda, who was out of spite, lets his pet bird go via accidental submission. On the way home from middle school, she found a really strange egg from another planet that landed on Earth and brought it home and gave that egg to Hanpeita. However, he isn't pleased with the weird egg. Suddenly, it swells up, cracks its shell, and out comes a pink, strange chicken-like alien creature named Ganmo. It speaks like a human being, and comes to live with the Tsukudas. Not wanting to be a mere freeloader, Ganmo takes the initiative to run errands, clean the house, etc., yet he blunders at everything he does. Ganmo then tries to clear his reputation, but his efforts only end up causing more confusion.

The days with Ganmo keep on going on like this and that and it was not long until the day when a charming young purple haired girl named Ayumi Ichigaya moves next door to the Tsukudas. She has a strange pet myna bird named Déjà Vu. It is foppish with a poisonous tongue and always teases Ganmo for being so odd-looking. Thus, the lives of Hanpeita and Ganmo becomes even more messed up all the effort for nothing.

References

External links

1982 manga
1984 anime television series debuts
Shōnen manga
Works by Fujihiko Hosono
Shogakukan franchises
Fuji TV original programming
Toei Animation television
Toei Animation films